Esarhaddon, also spelled Essarhaddon, Assarhaddon and Ashurhaddon  (Neo-Assyrian cuneiform: , also  , meaning "Ashur has given me a brother"; Biblical Hebrew:  ʾĒsar-Ḥaddōn) was the king of the Neo-Assyrian Empire from the death of his father Sennacherib in 681 BC to his own death in 669. The third king of the Sargonid dynasty, Esarhaddon is most famous for his conquest of Egypt in 671 BC, which made his empire the largest the world had ever seen, and for his reconstruction of Babylon, which had been destroyed by his father.

After Sennacherib's eldest son and heir Ashur-nadin-shumi had been captured and presumably executed in 694, the new heir had originally been the second eldest son, Arda-Mulissu, but in 684, Esarhaddon, a younger son, was appointed instead. Angered by this decision, Arda-Mulissu and another brother, Nabu-shar-usur, murdered their father in 681 and planned to seize the Assyrian throne. The murder, and Arda-Mulissu's aspirations of becoming king himself, made Esarhaddon's rise to the throne difficult and he first had to defeat his brothers in a six-week long civil war.

His brothers' attempted coup had been unexpected and troublesome for Esarhaddon and he would be plagued by paranoia and mistrust for his officials, governors and male family members until the end of his reign. As a result of this paranoia, most of the palaces used by Esarhaddon were high-security fortifications located outside of the major population centers of the cities. Also perhaps resulting from his mistrust for his male relatives, Esarhaddon's female relatives, such as his mother Naqiʾa and his daughter Serua-eterat, were allowed to wield considerably more influence and political power during his reign than women had been allowed in any previous period of Assyrian history.

Despite a relatively short and difficult reign, and being plagued by paranoia, depression and constant illness, Esarhaddon remains recognized as one of the greatest and most successful Assyrian kings. He quickly defeated his brothers in 681, completed ambitious and large-scale building projects in both Assyria and Babylonia, successfully campaigned in Media, the Arabian Peninsula, Anatolia, the Caucasus, and the Levant, defeated and conquered Lower Egypt, and ensured a peaceful transition of power to his two heirs Ashurbanipal and Shamash-shum-ukin after his death.

Background 

Although Esarhaddon had been the crown prince of Assyria for three years and the designated heir of King Sennacherib, with the entire empire having taken oaths to support him, it was only with great difficulty that he successfully ascended the Assyrian throne.

Sennacherib's first choice as successor had been his eldest son, Ashur-nadin-shumi, who he had appointed as the ruler of Babylon in about 700 BC. Shortly thereafter, Sennacherib attacked the land of Elam (modern day southern Iran) in order to defeat some Chaldean rebels which had fled there. In response to this attack, the Elamites invaded the south of Sennacherib's empire and in 694 successfully captured Ashur-nadin-shumi at the city of Sippar. The prince was taken back to Elam and probably executed.

After Ashur-nadin-shumi's presumed death, Sennacherib elevated his second eldest surviving son, Arda-Mulissu, as crown prince. After several years as crown prince, Arda-Mulissu was replaced as heir by Esarhaddon in 684. The reason for Arda-Mulissu's sudden dismissal from the prominent position is unknown, but it is clear that he was very disappointed. Esarhaddon described the reaction of his brothers to his appointment as heir in a later inscription:

Arda-Mulissu was forced to swear loyalty to Esarhaddon by his father, but repeatedly appealed to Sennacherib to again accept him as heir instead. These appeals were not successful, and Sennacherib came to realize that the situation was tense, so he sent Esarhaddon into exile in the western provinces for his own protection. Esarhaddon was unhappy with his exile and blamed his brothers for it, describing it with the following words:

Though Sennacherib had foreseen the danger of keeping Esarhaddon near his ambitious brothers, he had not foreseen the dangers to his own life. On 20 October 681, Arda-Mulissu and another of Sennacherib's sons, Nabu-shar-usur, attacked and killed their father in one of Nineveh's temples. However, Arda-Mulissu's dreams of claiming the throne would be crushed. The murder of Sennacherib had caused some friction between Arda-Mulissu and his supporters which delayed a potential coronation and in the meantime, Esarhaddon had raised an army. With this army at his back he met an army raised by his brothers at Hanigalbat, a region in the western parts of the empire, where most of the soldiers deserted his brothers to join him and the enemy generals fled. He then marched on Nineveh without opposition.

Six weeks after his father's death he was accepted and recognized as the new Assyrian king at Nineveh. Shortly after taking the throne, Esarhaddon made sure to execute all conspirators and political enemies he could get his hands on, including the families of his brothers. All servants involved with the security of the royal palace at Nineveh were "dismissed" (i.e. executed). Arda-Mulissu and Nabu-shar-usur survived this purge as they had escaped as exiles to the northern kingdom of Urartu. The frequent mentions of Arda-Mulissu and Esarhaddon's other brothers in his inscriptions indicates that he was surprised and bothered by their actions. Esarhaddon's own inscription chronicling his entry into Nineveh and his purge of those in support of the conspiracy reads as follows:

Reign

Paranoia 

As a result of his tumultuous rise to the throne, Esarhaddon was distrustful of his servants, vassals and family members. He frequently sought the advice of oracles and priests on whether any of his relatives or officials wished to harm him. Although highly distrustful of his male relatives, Esarhaddon seems to not have been paranoid in regards to his female relatives. During his reign his wife Esharra-hammat, his mother Naqiʾa and his daughter Serua-eterat all wielded considerably more influence and political power than women during earlier parts of Assyrian history.

Esarhaddon's paranoia was also reflected by where he chose to live. One of his main residences was a palace in the city of Nimrud originally constructed as an armory by his predecessor Shalmaneser III (r. 859–824 BC) almost two hundred years earlier. Rather than occupying a central and visible spot within the cultic and administrative center of the city, this palace was located in its outskirts on a separate mound which made it well-protected. Between 676 and 672, the palace was strengthened with its gateways being modified into impregnable fortifications which could seal the entire building off completely from the city. If these entrances were sealed, the only way into the palace would be through a steep and narrow path protected by several strong doors. A similar palace, also located on a separate mound far from the city center, was built at Nineveh.

All Assyrian kings are known to have sought the guidance of the sun-god Shamash (which was obtained through interpreting what was perceived as signs from the gods) for advice in political and military matters, such as whom to appoint to a certain position or if a planned military campaign would be successful. Queries concerning the possibility of betrayal are known only from Esarhaddon's reign.

Most scholars have classified Esarhaddon as paranoid, some going as far as suggesting that he developed paranoid personality disorder after the murder of his father. Other scholars have refrained from using this label, instead simply characterizing him as "mistrustful" and noting that paranoia is "by definition delusional and irrational" while Esarhaddon is likely to have had many real opponents and enemies.

Reconstruction of Babylon 

Esarhaddon wished to ensure the support of the inhabitants of Babylonia, the southern part of his empire. To this end, the king sponsored building and restoration projects throughout the south to a far greater extent than any of his predecessors had. Babylonia had only become part of the Assyrian empire relatively recently, having been ruled by native kings as vassals of the Assyrians until its conquest and annexation by the Assyrian king Tiglath-Pileser III in the previous century. Through his building program, Esarhaddon likely hoped to show the benefits of continuing Assyrian rule over the region and that he meant to rule Babylon with the same care and generosity as a native Babylonian king.

The city of Babylon, which gave its name to Babylonia, had been the political center of southern Mesopotamia for more than a thousand years. In an effort to quell Babylonian aspirations of independence, the city had been razed by Esarhaddon's father in 689 BC, and the statue of Bel (also known as Marduk), the patron deity of the city, had been carried off deep into Assyrian territory. The restoration of the city, announced by Esarhaddon in 680, became one of his most important projects.

Throughout Esarhaddon's reign, reports from the officials the king appointed to oversee the reconstruction speak of the great scope of the building project. The ambitious restoration of the city involved removing the large amount of debris left since Sennacherib's destruction of the city, resettlement of the many Babylonians who by this point were either enslaved or scattered across the empire, the reconstruction of most of the buildings, the restoration of the great temple complex dedicated to Bel, known as the Esagila, and the enormous ziggurat complex called Etemenanki as well as the restoration of the two inner walls of the city. The project was not only important because it illustrated goodwill towards the Babylonian people, but also because it allowed Esarhaddon to assume one of the essential characteristics the Babylonians invested in kingship. While the king of Assyria was generally supposed to be a military figure, the king of Babylon was ideally a builder and restorer, particularly of temples. Careful to not associate himself with the city's destruction, he only refers to himself as a king "ordained by the gods" in his inscriptions in Babylon, only mentioning Sennacherib in his inscriptions in the north and blaming the city's destruction not on his father but on Babylon "offending its gods". Writing of his reconstruction of Babylon, Esarhaddon states the following:

Esarhaddon successfully rebuilt the city gates, battlements, drains, courtyards, shrines and various other buildings and structures. Great care was taken during rebuilding of the Esagila, depositing precious stones, scented oils and perfumes into its foundations. Precious metals were chosen to cover the doors of the temple and the pedestal that was to house the statue of Bel was constructed in gold. A report from the governor Esarhaddon installed in Babylon confirms that the reconstruction was very well received by the Babylonians:

The rebuilding of the city was not completed during Esarhaddon's lifetime and much work was also done during the reign of his successors. Exactly how much of the reconstruction was done during the reign of Esarhaddon is uncertain, but stones with his inscriptions are found in the ruins of the city's temples, suggesting that a substantial amount of work had been completed. It is likely that Esarhaddon fulfilled most of his restoration goals, including the near complete restoration of Esagila and Etemenanki, with the possible exception of the city walls, which were likely fully restored by his successor.

Esarhaddon also sponsored restoration programs in other southern cities. In his first regnal year, Esarhaddon returned the statues of various southern gods that had been captured in wars and held in Assyria. During the time since Sennacherib's destruction of the city, the statue of Bel had, along with statues of several other traditional Babylonian deities, been kept at the town of Issete in the northeastern parts of Assyria. Although the statue of Bel remained in Assyria, statues of other gods were returned to the cities of Der, Humhumia and Sippar-aruru. In the years to follow, statues were also returned to the cities of Larsa and Uruk. As he had in Babylon, Esarhaddon also cleared away debris in Uruk and repaired the city's Eanna temple, dedicated to the goddess Ishtar. Similar small-scale restoration projects were undertaken in the cities of Nippur, Borsippa and Akkad.

Because of Esarhaddon's extensive building projects in the south and his efforts to link himself to the Babylonian royal tradition, some scholars have described him as the "Babylonian king of Assyria", but such a view might misrepresent the actual efforts of the king. Esarhaddon was king of both Assyria and Babylonia and his military and political base remained in the north, much like his predecessors. While his southern building projects were impressive, ambitious and unprecedented, he completed projects in the Assyrian heartland as well, although they were not as civically oriented as those in Babylonia. In Assyria, Esarhaddon constructed and restored temples but also worked on palaces and military fortifications.

Possibly in order to reassure the Assyrian people that his projects in the south would be matched with projects of equal proportion in the north, Esarhaddon ensured that repairs were made to the temple of Ešarra in Assur, one of the chief temples of northern Mesopotamia. Similar projects were conducted for temples in the Assyrian capital, Nineveh and in the city of Arbela. Though the temple-building projects conducted in the south were matched with temple-building projects in the north, Esarhaddon's prioritizing of Assyria over Babylonia is apparent from the various administrative and military building projects undertaken in the north and the complete lack of such projects in the south.

Military campaigns 

Vassals who had hoped to use the unstable political climate in Assyria to free themselves, perhaps believing that the new king hadn't yet consolidated his position well enough to stop them, and foreign powers eager to expand their territory soon realized that (despite Esarhaddon's distrust) the governors and soldiers of Assyria fully supported the new king. Two of the principal threats to Assyria were the kingdom of Urartu under King Rusa II in the north, a sworn enemy of Assyria which still sheltered his brothers, and the Cimmerians, a nomadic tribe which was harassing his western borders.

Esarhaddon allied with the nomadic Scythians, famous for their cavalry, in order to dissuade the Cimmerians from attacking but it doesn't appear to have helped. In 679 BC, the Cimmerians invaded the westernmost provinces of the empire and by 676 they had penetrated further into Esarhaddon's empire, destroying temples and cities on the way. To stop this invasion, Esarhaddon personally led his soldiers in battle in Cilicia and successfully repelled the Cimmerians. In his inscriptions, Esarhaddon claims to personally have killed the Cimmerian king Teušpa.

While the Cimmerian invasion was underway, one of Esarhaddon's vassals in the Levant, the city of Sidon, rebelled against his rule. Sidon had only recently been conquered by Assyria, having been made a vassal by Esarhaddon's father in 701. Esarhaddon marched his army down along the Mediterranean coast and captured the rebellious city in 677 but its king, Abdi-Milkutti, escaped by boat. He was captured and executed a year later, the same year that Esarhaddon decisively defeated the Cimmerians. Another rebellious vassal king, Sanduarri of "Kundu and Sissu" (likely locations in Cilicia), was also defeated and executed. In order to celebrate his victory, Esarhaddon had the heads of the two vassal kings hung around the necks of their nobles, who were paraded around Nineveh. Sidon was reduced to an Assyrian province and two cities which had been under the Sidonian king's control were gifted to another vassal king, Baal of Tyre. Esarhaddon discusses his victory over Sidon in a contemporary inscription:

After dealing with the problems in Sidon and Cilicia, Esarhaddon turned his attention to Urartu. At first, he struck at the Mannaeans, a people allied with Urartu, but by 673 he was openly at war with the kingdom of Urartu itself. As part of this war, Esarhaddon attacked and conquered the kingdom of Shupria, a vassal kingdom to Urartu whose capital Ubumu was located on the shores of Lake Van. The king's casus belli for this invasion was the king of Shupria's refusal to hand over political refugees from Assyria (possibly some of the conspirators behind Sennacherib's death) and though the Shuprian king had agreed to give up the refugees after a long series of letters, Esarhaddon considered it took him too long to relent. The Assyrians seized and plundered the city after the defenders had attempted to burn down the Assyrian siege weapons and the fires had instead spread into Ubumu. The political refugees were captured and executed. Some criminals from Urartu, who the Shuprian king had similarly refused to give up to the king of Urartu, were seized and sent to Urartu, perhaps in order to improve relations. Ubumu was repaired, renamed and annexed, with two eunuchs being appointed as its governors.

In 675, the Elamites invaded Babylonia and captured the city of Sippar. The Assyrian army had been away at the time, campaigning in Anatolia, and was forced to abandon this campaign in order to defend the southern provinces. Little is recorded of this conflict and as the fall of Sippar was an embarrassment it is not mentioned by Esarhaddon in any of his inscriptions. Shortly after seizing Sippar, the Elamite king Khumban-khaltash II died, which left the new Elamite king, Urtak, in a bad position. To repair relations with Assyria and avoid further conflict, Urtak abandoned the invasion and returned some statues of gods which the Elamites had stolen. The two monarchs entered into an alliance and exchanged children to be raised at each other's courts.

Near the end of Esarhaddon's seventh year on the throne, in the winter of 673, the king invaded Egypt. This invasion, which only a few Assyrian sources discuss, ended in what some scholars have assumed was possibly one of Assyria's worst defeats. The Egyptians had for years sponsored rebels and dissenters in Assyria and Esarhaddon had hoped to storm Egypt and take this rival out in one fell swoop. Because Esarhaddon had marched his army at great speed, the Assyrians were exhausted once they arrived outside the Egyptian-controlled city of Ashkelon, where they were defeated by the Kushite Pharaoh Taharqa. Following this defeat, Esarhaddon abandoned his plan to conquer Egypt for the moment and withdrew back to Nineveh.

Deteriorating health and depression 
By the time of Esarhaddon's first failed invasion of Egypt in 673 BC, it had become apparent that the king's health was deteriorating. This presented a problem since one of the chief requirements of being the Assyrian king was that one had perfect mental and physical health. The king was constantly suffering from some illness and would often spend days in his sleeping quarters without food, drink and human contact. The death of Esharra-hammat, his beloved wife, in February 672 BC is unlikely to have improved his condition. Surviving court documents overwhelmingly point to Esarhaddon often being sad. The deaths of his wife and their recently born infant child made Esarhaddon depressed. This can clearly be seen in letters written by the king's chief exorcist Adad-shumu-usur, the man who was chiefly responsible for Esarhaddon's well-being. One such letter reads:

Notes and letters preserved from those at the royal court, including Esarhaddon's physicians, describe his condition in some detail, discussing violent vomiting, constant fever, nosebleeds, dizziness, painful earaches, diarrhea and depression. The king often feared that his death was near, and his condition would have been apparent to anyone who saw him as he was affected by a permanent skin rash which covered most of his body, including his face. The physicians, likely the best in Assyria, were perplexed and eventually had to confess that they were powerless to aid him. This is clearly expressed in their letters, such as the following:

Because the Assyrians saw illness as divine punishment, a king who was ill would have been seen as an indication that the gods were not supportive of him. Because of this, Esarhaddon's poor health had to be hidden from his subjects at all costs. That his subjects remained unaware was ensured through the ancient royal Assyrian tradition that anyone who approached the king had to be both on their knees and veiled.

Planning the succession 

Seeing as he himself had only acquired the Assyrian throne with great difficulty, Esarhaddon took several steps in order to ensure that the transition of power following his own death would be a smooth and peaceful one. A treaty concluded between Esarhaddon and his vassal Ramataia, the ruler of a Median kingdom in the east called Urakazabarna in  672 BC makes it clear that all of Esarhaddon's sons were still minors at the time, which was problematic. The same treaty also shows that Esarhaddon was worried that there might be several factions who might oppose his successor's rise to the throne after his death, listing potential opposing forces as his successor's brothers, uncles and cousins and even "descendants of former royalty" and "one of the chiefs or governors of Assyria".

This indicates that at least some of Esarhaddon's brothers were still alive at this point and that they or their children could possibly represent threats to his own children. The mention of "descendants of former royalty" might allude to the fact that Esarhaddon's grandfather Sargon II had acquired the Assyrian throne through usurpation and may not have been related to any earlier Assyrian king. It is possible that descendants of earlier kings may still have been alive and in a position to press their claims on the Assyrian throne.

In order to avoid a civil war upon his death, Esarhaddon appointed his eldest son Sin-nadin-apli as crown prince in 674, but he died just two years later, again threatening a succession crisis. This time, Esarhaddon appointed two crown princes; his eldest living son Shamash-shum-ukin was selected as the heir to Babylon whilst a younger son, Ashurbanipal, was selected as the heir to Assyria. The two princes arrived at the capital of Nineveh together and partook in a celebration with foreign representatives and Assyrian nobles and soldiers. Promoting one of his sons as the heir to Assyria and another as the heir to Babylon was a new idea, for in the past decades the Assyrian king had simultaneously been the King of Babylon.

The choice to name a younger son as crown prince of Assyria, which was clearly Esarhaddon's primary title, and an older son as crown prince of Babylon might be explained by the mothers of the two sons. While Ashurbanipal's mother was likely Assyrian in origin, Shamash-shum-ukin was the son of a woman from Babylon (though this is uncertain, Ashurbanipal and Shamash-shum-ukin may have shared the same mother which would probably have had problematic consequences if Shamash-shum-ukin was to ascend to the Assyrian throne. Since Ashurbanipal was the next oldest son, he then was the superior candidate to the throne. Esarhaddon probably surmised that the Babylonians would be content with someone of Babylonian heritage as their king and as such set Shamash-shum-ukin to inherit Babylon and the southern parts of his empire instead. Treaties drawn up by Esarhaddon are somewhat unclear as to the relationship he intended his two sons to have. It is clear that Ashurbanipal was the primary heir to the empire and that Shamash-shum-ukin was to swear him an oath of allegiance, but other parts also specify that Ashurbanipal was not to interfere in Shamash-shum-ukin's affairs which indicates a more equal standing. The two crown princes soon became heavily involved with Assyrian politics, which lifted some of the burden from the shoulders of their sickly father.

Esarhaddon's mother Naqiʾa ensured that any potential enemies and claimants took an oath to support Ashurbanipal's rise to the Assyrian throne, another step to avoid the bloodshed which had begun Esarhaddon's own reign. In order to ensure the succession of Ashurbanipal and Shamash-shum-ukin, Esarhaddon himself also concluded succession treaties with at least six independent rulers in the east and with several of his own governors outside the Assyrian heartland in 672. Perhaps the main motivating factor to create these treaties was the possibility that his brothers, particularly Arda-Mulissu, were still alive and sought to claim the Assyrian throne. Some inscriptions suggest that they were alive and free as late as 673.

Conquest of Egypt and substitute kings 

In the early months of 671 BC, Esarhaddon again marched against Egypt. The army assembled for this second Egytian campaign was considerably larger than the one Esarhaddon had used in 673 and he marched at a much slower speed in order to avoid the problems that had plagued his previous attempt. On his way he passed through Harran, one of the major cities in the western parts of his empire. Here, a prophecy was revealed to the king, which predicted that Esarhaddon's conquest of Egypt would be a successful one. According to a letter sent to Ashurbanipal after Esarhaddon's death, the prophecy was the following:

Three months after having received this prophecy, Esarhaddon's forces were victorious in their first battle with the Egyptians. Despite the prophecy and initial success, Esarhaddon was not convinced of his own safety. Just eleven days after he had defeated the Egyptians, he performed the "substitute king" ritual, an ancient Assyrian method intended to protect and shield the king from imminent danger announced by some sort of omen. Esarhaddon had performed the ritual earlier in his reign, but this time it left him unable to command his invasion of Egypt.

The "substitute king" ritual involved the Assyrian monarch going into hiding for a hundred days, during which a substitute (preferably one with mental deficiencies) took the king's place by sleeping in the royal bed, wearing the crown and the royal garbs and eating the king's food. During these hundred days, the actual king remained hidden and was known only under the alias "the farmer". The goal of the ritual was that any evil intended for the king would instead be focused on the substitute king, who was killed regardless of if anything had happened at the end of the hundred days, keeping the real monarch safe.

Whatever omen Esarhaddon was fearing, he survived 671 and would perform the ritual twice during the two years that followed, which left him unable to fulfill his duties as the Assyrian king for a total of almost a year. During this time, most of the civil administration of his empire was overseen by his crown princes and the army in Egypt was likely commanded by his chief eunuch, Ashur-nasir. The Assyrian army defeated the Egyptians in two additional battles and successfully seized and plundered the Egyptian capital of Memphis. The Assyrian army was also forced to fight some of their vassals in the Levant, such as Baal of Tyre, who had allied with the Egyptians against Esarhaddon.

Although the Pharaoh Taharqa had escaped, Esarhaddon captured the Pharaoh's family, including his son and wife, and most of the royal court, which were sent back to Assyria as hostages. Governors loyal to the Assyrian king were placed in charge of the conquered territories. In his victory stele, erected to commemorate the defeat of Egypt, Esarhaddon is depicted in a majestic pose with a war mace in his hand and a vassal king kneeling before him. Also present is the son of the defeated pharaoh, kneeling and with a rope around his neck. The conquest resulted in the relocation of a large number of Egyptians to the Assyrian heartland. In an excerpt from the text inscribed on his victory stele, Esarhaddon describes the conquest with the following words:

Conspiracy of 671–670 BC 

Shortly following Esarhaddon's victory in Egypt, news spread throughout his empire of a new prophecy at Harran. Since Esarhaddon had conquered Egypt and proven the previous prophecy from the city right, the oracles of Harran were seen as trustworthy. The prophecy, spoken by an ecstatic woman (the oracle of Nusku), was the following:

The meaning of the prophecy was clear: it provided a possible religious foundation for a revolt against Esarhaddon's rule by declaring all of Sennacherib's descendants as usurpers. It is possible that Esarhaddon's skin condition would have become apparent during his visit to Harran, which might be the reason for declaring him illegitimate. The identity of the Sasî who was proclaimed as the rightful king is unknown but he must have been connected to previous Assyrian royalty in some manner as he would otherwise not have been eligible for the throne. It is possible that he was a descendant of Esarhaddon's grandfather Sargon II. Sasî managed to rally a large amount of support throughout the empire quickly, even rallying Esarhaddon's chief eunuch Ashur-nasir to his side.

It did not take long for Esarhaddon to learn of the conspiracy. Because of his paranoia, Esarhaddon had a vast information network of servants throughout the empire, sworn to report to him once they heard of any planned actions against him. Through these reports, Esarhaddon was made aware that supporters of Sasî were active not only in Harran, but also in Babylon and in the Assyrian heartland. For a while, Esarhaddon simply gathered information on the activities of the conspirators and fearing for his life, performed the "substitute king" ritual for a second time in 671 BC, just three months after he had previously completed it.

As soon as the ritual was complete, Esarhaddon emerged from hiding and brutally massacred the conspirators, the second such purge during his reign. The fate of Sasî and the woman who had proclaimed him king is unknown, but it is likely that they were captured and executed. Because of the extent of the officials killed, the administrative structure of Assyria suffered more than it had in many years. For the first few months of 670, no official was chosen to select the name of the year, something which was extremely rare in Assyrian history. Remains of several buildings in various cities, believed to have been the homes of supporters of Sasî, have been dated as having been destroyed in 670. The aftermath of the conspiracy saw Esarhaddon tighten security considerably. He introduced two new ranks into the court hierarchy so as to make it more difficult to meet him, which also limited the number of officials who controlled the access to his palaces.

Death 

Although he had successfully survived the conspiracy, Esarhaddon remained diseased and paranoid. Just a year later, in 669 BC, he once more performed the "substitute king" ritual. Around this time, the defeated Pharaoh Taharqa appeared from the south and, perhaps combined with the chaotic political situation within Assyria, inspired Egypt to attempt to free itself from Esarhaddon's control.

Esarhaddon received word of this rebellion and learnt that even some of his own governors who he had appointed in Egypt had ceased to pay tribute to him and joined the rebels. After emerging from his hundred days of hiding, apparently relatively healthy by his standards, Esarhaddon left to campaign against Egypt for the third time. The king died at Harran on 1 November 669, before reaching the Egyptian border. The absence of evidence to the contrary suggests that his death was natural and unexpected.

After Esarhaddon's death, his sons Ashurbanipal and Shamsh-shum-ukin successfully ascended the thrones of Assyria and Babylon without political turmoil and bloodshed, meaning that Esarhaddon's succession plans were a success, at least initially.

Diplomacy

Diplomacy with the Arabs 

The support of the Arabic tribes of the Sinai Peninsula had been crucial in Esarhaddon's 671 BC Egyptian campaign. Esarhaddon was also determined to retain the loyalty of the Arabic tribes who had been subjugated by his father in the Arabian Peninsula, particularly around the city of Adummatu. The king of Adummatu, Hazael, paid tribute to Esarhaddon and sent him several presents, which were reciprocated by Esarhaddon through returning the statues of Hazael's gods which had been seized by Sennacherib years earlier. When Hazael died and was succeeded by his son Yauta, Yauta's position as king was recognized by Esarhaddon, who also aided the new king in defeating a rebellion against his rule. Shortly thereafter, Yautu rebelled against Esarhaddon and though he was defeated by the Assyrian army, he successfully retained his independence until the reign of Ashurbanipal.

Esarhaddon also successfully appointed a woman who had been raised at the Assyrian royal palace, Tabua, as "queen of the Arabs" and allowed her to return to and govern her people. In another episode, Esarhaddon invaded the country of "Bazza" in 676 (assumed to be located in the east of the Arabian Peninsula) after being petitioned for aid by a local king of a city called Yadi. The campaign apparently saw the Assyrians defeating eight kings of this region and granting their conquests to the king of Yadi.

Diplomacy with the Medes 
The reign of Esarhaddon saw many of the Medes becoming Assyrian vassals. Esarhaddon's armies had proven to the Medes that Assyria was a great power to be feared when the Assyrians defeated the Median kings Eparna and Shidirparna near Mount Bikni (the location of which is unknown beyond being located somewhere in central Media) at some point before 676 BC. As a result of this victory, many of the Medes willingly swore allegiance to Assyria and brought gifts to Nineveh and allowed Esarhaddon to appoint Assyrian governors to their lands.

When Esarhaddon made his subjects swear to uphold his wishes in regards to the succession of Ashurbanipal and Shamash-shum-ukin, some of the vassals made to swear allegiance to his successors were rulers and princes from Media. Esarhaddon's relations with the Medes weren't always peaceful as there are records of Median raids against Assyria as late as 672 and the Medes are constantly mentioned in Esarhaddon's requests to his oracle as potential enemies of Assyria. Among the chief rivals of Esarhaddon in Media was a figure the Assyrians called Kashtariti, who raided Assyrian territory. This king is perhaps identical with Phraortes, the second king of the Median Empire.

Family and children 

From inscriptions it can be ascertained that Esarhaddon had multiple wives as his succession treaties differentiate between "sons born by Ashurbanipal's mother" and "the rest of the sons engendered by Esarhaddon". Only the name of one of these wives, Esarhaddon's queen Esharra-hammat (Ešarra-ḫammat) is known. Esharra-hammat is chiefly known from sources after her death, especially in regards to a mausoleum Esarhaddon constructed for her. It is uncertain which of Esarhaddon's many children were hers.

Esarhaddon had at least 18 children. Some of these children suffered from constant illness, similar to Esarhaddon, and required permanent and constant medical attention by the court physicians. Contemporary letters by Esarhaddon's subjects discussing the king's "numerous children" confirm that his family was viewed as large by ancient Assyrian standards. Those of Esarhaddon's children known by name are the following:

Serua-eterat – the eldest of Esarhaddon's daughters and the only one known by name, Serua-eterat was older than Ashurbanipal and might have been the eldest of all of Esarhaddon's children. She held a position of importance in Esarhaddon's court and in the later court of Ashurbanipal as attested by numerous inscriptions.
Sin-nadin-apli ( or  ) – Esarhaddon's eldest son and crown prince from 674 BC until his unexpected death in 672.
Shamash-shum-ukin – Esarhaddon's second eldest son, crown prince and heir to Babylon 672–669 and King of Babylon thereafter.
Shamash-metu-uballit – possibly Esarhaddon's third eldest son. His name, which means "Shamash has brought to life the dead", suggests that he suffered from poor health or had a difficult birth. He was still alive by 672 and his health might be the reason why he was overlooked in favor of his younger brother as heir. It is possible that Shamash-metu-uballit did not accept the succession of Ashurbanipal and paid for it with his life.
 Ashurbanipal) – possibly Essarhadon's fourth eldest son, crown prince and heir to Assyria 672–669 and King of Assyria thereafter.
Ashur-taqisha-liblut – possibly Esarhaddon's fifth eldest son. Thought to have been a sickly child, possibly dead before 672.
Ashur-mukin-paleya – possibly Esarhaddon's sixth eldest son. Probably born after Esarhaddon was already king. Was made a priest in Assur during the reign of Ashurbanipal.
Ashur-etel-shame-erseti-muballissu – possibly Esarhaddon's seventh eldest son. Probably born after Esarhaddon was already king. Was made a priest in Harran during the reign of Ashurbanipal.
Ashur-sarrani-muballissu – attested only in a single letter, it is possible that Ashur-sarrani-muballissu is identical to Ashur-etel-shame-erseti-muballissu.
Sin-Peru-ukin – known from a letter inquiring as to when it was appropriate to visit the king and another letter in which he is described as healthy.

Legacy

Assyria after Esarhaddon's death 

After Esarhaddon's death, his son Ashurbanipal became the king of Assyria. After attending his brother's coronation, Shamash-shum-ukin returned the stolen statue of Bel to Babylon and became the king of Babylon. At Babylon, Ashurbanipal sponsored a lavish coronation festival for his brother. Despite his royal title, Shamash-shum-ukin was a vassal to Ashurbanipal; Ashurbanipal continued to offer the royal sacrifices in Babylon (traditionally offered by the Babylonian monarch) and the governors in the south were Assyrian. The army and guards present in the south were also Assyrians. Most of Shamash-shum-ukin's early reign in Babylon was spent peacefully, restoring fortications and temples.

After he and his brother had been properly inaugurated as monarchs, Ashurbanipal left in 667 BC to complete Esarhaddon's unfinished final campaign against Egypt. In his 667 campaign, Ashurbanipal marched as far south as Thebes, plundering on his way, and upon his victory he left the joint Pharaohs Psamtik I (who had been educated at Esarhaddon's court) and Necho I as vassal rulers. In 666–665, Ashurbanipal defeated an attempt by Tantamani, nephew of Pharaoh Taharqa, to retake Egypt.

As Shamash-shum-ukin grew stronger, he became increasingly interested in becoming independent of his brother. In 652 Shamash-shum-ukin allied with a coalition of Assyria's enemies, including Elam, Kush and the Chaldeans, and forbade Ashurbanipal from any further sacrifices in any southern city. This led to a civil war that dragged on for four years. By 650 Shamash-shum-ukin's situation looked grim, with Ashubanipal's forces having besieged Sippar, Borsippa, Kutha and Babylon itself. Babylon finally fell in 648 and was plundered by Ashurbanipal. Shamash-shum-ukin died, possibly committing suicide.

Throughout his long reign, Ashurbanipal would campaign against all of Assyria's enemies and rivals. After Ashurbanipal's death, his sons Ashur-etil-ilani and Sinsharishkun retained control of his empire for a time, but during their reigns many of Assyria's vassals seized the opportunity to declare themselves independent. From 627 to 612, the Assyrian empire effectively disintegrated and a coalition of Assyrian enemies, chiefly led by the Median Empire and the newly independent Neo-Babylonian Empire pushed into the Assyrian heartland. In 612, Nineveh itself was plundered and razed. Assyria fell with the defeat of its final king, Ashur-uballit II, at Harran in 609.

Assessment by historians 
Esarhaddon, his predecessor Sennacherib and his successor Ashurbanipal are recognized as three of the greatest Assyrian kings. He is typically characterized as gentler and milder than his predecessor, taking greater efforts to pacify and integrate the peoples he conquered. The king has been described as one of the most successful of the Neo-Assyrian rulers on account of his many achievements, including the subjugation of Egypt, the successful and peaceful control of the notoriously rebellious Babylonia and his ambitious construction projects. According to Assyriologist Karen Radner, Esarhaddon emerges more clearly as an individual from available sources than all other Assyrian kings. Most Assyrian kings are known only from their royal inscriptions, but the decade of Esarhaddon's rule is exceptionally well documented because many other documents dating to his reign, such as court correspondence, have survived as well.

Ashurbanipal, who would famously gather ancient Mesopotamian literary works for his famous library, had already begun collecting such works during the reign of Esarhaddon. It is possible that Esarhaddon is to be credited with encouraging Ashurbanipal's collection and education.

Titles 

In an inscription describing his appointment as crown prince and his rise to power, Esarhaddon uses the following royal titles:

In another inscription, the titles of Esarhaddon read as follows:

A longer version of Esarhaddon's royal titles, and an accompanying boast of his gifts from the gods, preserved in another of his inscriptions, reads:

See also 
Esarhaddon's Treaty with Ba'al of Tyre (K 3500 + K 4444 + K 10235)
Esarhaddon's Succession Treaty or Vassal Treaty with Ramataia of Urakazabarna (BM 132548)
List of Assyrian kings
Military history of the Neo-Assyrian Empire
List of biblical figures identified in extra-biblical sources
Palace of Esarhaddon discovered at Mosul (Nineveh) in 2017 under Tomb of Jonah (Yunus) destroyed by ISIL in 2014

Notes

References

Bibliography

Web sources

External links 

 Daniel David Luckenbill's Ancient Records of Assyria and Babylonia Volume 2: Historical Records of Assyria From Sargon to the End, containing translations of a large number of Esarhaddon's inscriptions.

 
Sargonid dynasty
710s BC births
Year of birth uncertain
669 BC deaths
7th-century BC Assyrian kings
7th-century BC Babylonian kings
Kings of the Universe